Catherine Spencer may refer to:
 Catherine Spencer (novelist)
 Catherine Spencer (rugby union)